There have been two rail crashes at Stafford in recent times:
8 March 1996
August 1990

A few miles away, there was the Hixon rail crash on 6 January 1968.